Domenico Frare (born 10 May 1996) is an Italian football player. He plays for Cittadella.

Club career
After representing Parma teams on junior levels, he signed with Serie C club Tuttocuoio for his first professional contract before the 2015–16 season. He made his Serie C debut for Tuttocuoio on 17 January 2016 in a game against Rimini as a starter.

On 1 June 2017 he moved to another Serie C team Pontedera on a three-year contract.

On 4 July 2018 he signed with Serie B club Cittadella for an undisclosed fee.

References

External links
 

1996 births
People from Conegliano
Footballers from Veneto
Living people
Italian footballers
Association football defenders
A.C. Tuttocuoio 1957 San Miniato players
U.S. Città di Pontedera players
A.S. Cittadella players
Serie B players
Serie C players
Sportspeople from the Province of Treviso